January 2016

See also

References

 01
January 2016 events in the United States